Robert Pranz (born 22 October 1905, date of death unknown) was an Austrian gymnast. He competed at the 1936 Summer Olympics and the 1948 Summer Olympics.

References

1905 births
Year of death missing
Austrian male artistic gymnasts
Olympic gymnasts of Austria
Gymnasts at the 1936 Summer Olympics
Gymnasts at the 1948 Summer Olympics
Place of birth missing
20th-century Austrian people